"Hanging with Wolves" is a song by American rapper Lil Durk, released on December 9, 2022 as the second single from his and record label Only the Family's collaborative compilation album Loyal Bros 2 (2022). It was produced by Chopsquad DJ.

Content
Lyrically, Lil Durk raps about life in the streets and its pitfalls.

Music video
A music video for the song was released alongside the single. It sees Lil Durk "wreaking havoc with his crew".

Charts

References

2022 singles
2022 songs
Lil Durk songs
Songs written by Lil Durk
Empire Distribution singles